The Crime Museum is a private museum of the Metropolitan Police in London.

Crime museum may also refer to:

 Fürth Crime Museum, a museum in Fürth, Germany
 Vienna Crime Museum, a museum in Vienna, Switzerland
 Zürich Crime Museum, a museum in Zurich, Switzerland

See also 

 National Museum of Crime and Punishment, a museum in the United States
 The Museum of Crime, a 1945 Mexican film
 List of police museums